"One of Those Nights Tonight" is a song written by Susan Longacre and Rick Giles, and recorded by American country music artist Lorrie Morgan.  It was released in October 1997 as the second single from her album Shakin' Things Up.  The song reached number 14 on the Billboard Hot Country Singles & Tracks chart in February 1998.

Chart performance

References

1997 singles
1997 songs
Lorrie Morgan songs
BNA Records singles
Song recordings produced by James Stroud
Songs written by Rick Giles
Songs written by Susan Longacre